Charles Baxter "Foots" Clement (1904–1976) was a college football player and prominent Memphis businessman.  He was posthumously inducted into the Alabama Sports Hall of Fame in 1989.

University of Alabama
Clement was a prominent tackle for the Alabama Crimson Tide football team of the University of Alabama from 1928 to 1930. He wore a size 14 shoe. He also participated in track and boxing.

1930
He was the captain of the 1930 national championship team. He was selected first-team All-Southern on the selection compiled from 20 of 23 southern coaches by the United Press and third-team All-American in the captain's poll of the Central Press Association.

References

External links

American football tackles
Alabama Crimson Tide football players
All-Southern college football players
Players of American football from Arkansas
People from Yell County, Arkansas
People from Memphis, Tennessee
1904 births
1976 deaths